The meridian 3° west of Greenwich is a line of longitude that extends from the North Pole across the Arctic Ocean, the Atlantic Ocean, Europe, Africa, the Southern Ocean, and Antarctica to the South Pole.

The 3rd meridian west forms a great circle with the 177th meridian east.

From Pole to Pole
Starting at the North Pole and heading south to the South Pole, the 3rd meridian west passes through:

{| class="wikitable plainrowheaders"
! scope="col" width="125" | Co-ordinates
! scope="col" | Country, territory or sea
! scope="col" | Notes
|-
| style="background:#b0e0e6;" | 
! scope="row" style="background:#b0e0e6;" | Arctic Ocean
| style="background:#b0e0e6;" |
|-
| style="background:#b0e0e6;" | 
! scope="row" style="background:#b0e0e6;" | Atlantic Ocean
| style="background:#b0e0e6;" |
|-
| 
! scope="row" | 
| Scotland — island of Westray
|-
| style="background:#b0e0e6;" | 
! scope="row" style="background:#b0e0e6;" | Atlantic Ocean
| style="background:#b0e0e6;" | Westray Firth
|-
| 
! scope="row" | 
| Scotland — islands of Rousay and Wyre
|-
| style="background:#b0e0e6;" | 
! scope="row" style="background:#b0e0e6;" | North Sea
| style="background:#b0e0e6;" | Wide Firth
|-
| 
! scope="row" | 
| Scotland — island of Mainland (Orkney)
|-
| style="background:#b0e0e6;" | 
! scope="row" style="background:#b0e0e6;" | Scapa Flow
| style="background:#b0e0e6;" |
|-
| 
! scope="row" | 
| Scotland — island of South Ronaldsay
|-
| style="background:#b0e0e6;" | 
! scope="row" style="background:#b0e0e6;" | North Sea
| style="background:#b0e0e6;" |
|-
| 
! scope="row" | 
| Scotland — passing through Dundee (at )
|-
| style="background:#b0e0e6;" | 
! scope="row" style="background:#b0e0e6;" | Firth of Forth
| style="background:#b0e0e6;" |
|-valign="top"
| 
! scope="row" | 
| Scotland — passing just east of Edinburgh (at ) England — from 
|-
| style="background:#b0e0e6;" | 
! scope="row" style="background:#b0e0e6;" | Irish Sea
| style="background:#b0e0e6;" | Morecambe Bay
|-valign="top"
| 
| 
! scope="row" | England — passing just west of Liverpool (at ) Wales — from  England — from  Wales — from  England — from  Wales — from  England — from  Wales — from  England — from  Wales — from 
|-
| style="background:#b0e0e6;" | 
! scope="row" style="background:#b0e0e6;" | Bristol Channel
| style="background:#b0e0e6;" |
|-
| 
! scope="row" | 
| England
|-
| style="background:#b0e0e6;" | 
! scope="row" style="background:#b0e0e6;" | English Channel
| style="background:#b0e0e6;" |
|-
| 
! scope="row" | 
|
|-valign="top"
| style="background:#b0e0e6;" | 
! scope="row" style="background:#b0e0e6;" | Atlantic Ocean
| style="background:#b0e0e6;" | Bay of Biscay — passing just east of Belle Île,  (at )
|-
| 
! scope="row" | 
| Passing just west of Bilbao (at )
|-valign="top"
| style="background:#b0e0e6;" | 
! scope="row" style="background:#b0e0e6;" | Mediterranean Sea
| style="background:#b0e0e6;" | Alboran Sea — passing just east of Isla de Alborán,  (at )
|-
| 
! scope="row" | 
| Passing just west of the exclave of Melilla,  (at )
|-
| 
! scope="row" | 
|
|-valign="top"
| 
! scope="row" | 
| Passing through Timbuktu (at )
|-
| 
! scope="row" | 
|
|-
| 
! scope="row" | 
|
|-
| 
! scope="row" | 
|
|-
| 
! scope="row" | 
|
|-
| 
! scope="row" | 
|
|-
| style="background:#b0e0e6;" | 
! scope="row" style="background:#b0e0e6;" | Atlantic Ocean
| style="background:#b0e0e6;" |
|-
| style="background:#b0e0e6;" | 
! scope="row" style="background:#b0e0e6;" | Southern Ocean
| style="background:#b0e0e6;" |
|-
| 
! scope="row" | Antarctica
| Queen Maud Land — claimed by 
|-
|}

See also
2nd meridian west
4th meridian west

w003 meridian west